199 Lives: The Travis Pastrana Story is a 2008 documentary film about the life of off-road racing legend Travis Pastrana by ESPN films.

In fall of 2009, 199 Lives was released on DVD and made available for download via Microsoft's Xbox Live Video Marketplace.

References

External links
 

2008 films
ESPN Films films
Documentary films about auto racing
Off-road racing
American auto racing films
American sports documentary films
2000s English-language films
2000s American films